HD 166 or V439 Andromedae (ADS 69 A) is a 6th magnitude star in the constellation Andromeda, approximately 45 light years away from Earth. It is a variable star of the BY Draconis type, varying between magnitudes 6.13 and 6.18 with a 6.23 days periodicity. It appears within one degree of the star Alpha Andromedae and is a member of the Hercules-Lyra association moving group. It also happens to be less than 2 degrees from right ascension 00h 00m.

Star characteristics
HD 166 is a K-type main sequence star, cooler and dimmer than the Sun, and has a stellar classification of K0Ve where the e suffix indicates the presence of emission lines in the spectrum. The star has a proper motion of 0.422 arcseconds per year in a direction 114.1° from north. It has an estimated visual luminosity of 61% of the Sun, and is emitting like a blackbody with an effective temperature of 5,327K. It has a diameter that is about 90% the size of the Sun and a radial velocity of −6.9 km/s. Age estimates range from as low as 78 million years old based on its chromospheric activity, up to 9.6 billion years based on a comparison with theoretical evolutionary tracks.

An infrared excess has been detected around HD 166, most likely indicating the presence of a circumstellar disk at a radius of 7.5 AU. The temperature of this dust is 90 K.

Variability
It has been found that the periodicity in the photometric variability of HD 166 is coincident with the rotation period. This leads to its classification as a BY Draconis variable, where brightness variations are caused by the presence of large starspots on the surface and by chromospheric activity.

References

External links
 Image HD 166
 nstars.nau.edu

Andromeda (constellation)
BY Draconis variables
000166
Spectroscopic binaries
K-type main-sequence stars
HD, 000166
Andromedae, V439
0008
000544
Durchmusterung objects
0005
Emission-line stars